ISRO Pad Abort Test was an Indian Space Research Organisation launch escape system test of its crew module as part of Indian Human Spaceflight Programme. The successful test took place on 5 July 2018.
 
A Pad Abort Test is a trial run for the spacecraft's launch abort system (sometimes called a launch escape system). This system is designed to quickly get the crew and spacecraft away from the rocket in the event of a potential failure. It is similar to an ejection seat for a fighter pilot, but instead of ejecting the pilot out of the spacecraft, the entire spacecraft is "ejected" away from the launch vehicle. The technology developed is expected to be applied to the first Indian crewed spacecraft called Gaganyaan, scheduled to be launched in 2022.

Flight 

The countdown for the test started at 2:00 am (IST) on 5 July 2018. At 7:00 am (IST) The Crew Escape System with crew module successfully lifted-off from Satish Dhawan Space Centre. It was carried skyward using seven solid-fueled rocket motors keeping within the safe g-force limits. Later recovery boats were sent to recover the crew module. The total duration of the test mission was 259 seconds. The test launch process was recorded by around 300 sensors. Main objectives of test were nominal 20 second ascent and 200 seconds of descent, not including the splashdown. Chute detachment was a scheduled event occurring around 259.4 seconds after launch as intended.

See also

 Gaganyaan, India's crewed spacecraft
 Indian Human Spaceflight Programme
 Launch escape system

References

External links
 Official video

Indian Space Research Organisation
Test spaceflights
2018 in spaceflight